Apple Spur is an unincorporated community in Township 2, Benton County, Arkansas, United States.

References

Unincorporated communities in Benton County, Arkansas
Unincorporated communities in Arkansas